It's The Dubliners is a compilation album released by Hallmark, containing tracks from The Dubliners' early albums and EPs released on the Transatlantic label.

Track listing

Side One
 "Master McGrath"
 "Walking in the Dew" (mistitled as "Waltzing in the Dew")
 "The Cook in the Kitchen"
 "Boulavogue"
 "Reels - Sligo Maid/Colonel Rodney"

Side Two
 "Peggy Lettermore"
 "Preab San Ól" (title wrongly given as 'Ragman's Ball')
 "I'll Tell Me Ma"
 "The Mason's Apron"
 "The Woman from Wexford"

The Dubliners compilation albums
1969 compilation albums
Hallmark Records compilation albums